The 2018 World Rugby Pacific Nations Cup was the thirteenth edition of the Pacific Nations Cup annual international rugby union competition. All matches for the 2018 tournament, played over two rounds, were held in Fiji at the ANZ National Stadium in Suva. 

Hosts Fiji and fellow Pacific nations Samoa and Tonga were joined by Georgia who competing for the first time in the tournament. Romania was also initially scheduled to compete for the Cup until Samoa's place in the competition was confirmed in May 2018.

Fiji won the tournament with two wins from their two matches played. Tonga and Georgia placed second and third respectively with one win each.

Standings

Fixtures
The match schedule:

Round 1

Notes:
 David Feao, Sione Fifita, David Lolohea, Viliami Lolohea and Nasi Manu (all Tonga) made their international debuts.
 Jaba Bregvadze (Georgia) earned his 50th test cap.

Notes:
 Sevanaia Galala, Eroni Mawi, Alivereti Veitokani and Veremalua Vugakoto (all Fiji) and Rodney Iona, Ed Fidow and Mat Luamanu (all Samoa) made their international debuts.
 Vereniki Goneva (Fiji) earned his 50th test cap.

Round 2

Notes:
 Semi Radradra (Fiji) made his international debut.
 This was Fiji's largest winning margin over Georgia, surpassing the 5-point difference set in 2012, and their first win over Georgia in Fiji.

Statistics

Points scorers

Try scorers

Squads

Note: Number of caps and players' ages are indicated as of 9 June 2018 – the tournament's opening day, pre first tournament match.

Fiji
On 30 May, John McKee finalised a 32-man squad for the Pacific Nations Cup and their June test match against Tonga.

Georgia
On 1 June, Head Coach Milton Haig finalised a 32-man touring squad for the Pacific Nations Cup and their June test match against Japan.

Samoa
On 22 May, Titimaea Tafua named a 28-man squad for the Pacific Nations Cup and Samoa's 2019 Rugby World Cup two-test play-off series against a yet to be decided team.

Tonga
On 21 May, Toutai Kefu named a 30-man squad for the Pacific Nations Cup and their June test match against Fiji.

See also
 2018 mid-year rugby union internationals

References

External links
 Pacific Nations Cup web page at World Rugby

2018
2018 rugby union tournaments for national teams
2018 in Oceanian rugby union
2018 in Fijian rugby union
2018 in Tongan rugby union
World Rugby Pacific Nations Cup